The North African white-toothed shrew (Crocidura pachyura) is a species of mammal in the family Soricidae. It is found on the islands of Ibiza, Sardinia, and Pantelleria in the Mediterranean Sea, in northern Algeria, and in northern Tunisia.

References

Mammals described in 1835